Pierluigi Frosio (20 September 1948 – 20 February 2022) was an Italian professional football player and manager. He played as a sweeper as a player.

Playing career 
Born in the Casignolo district of Monza, Frosio began his youth career at local club Gerardiana. He made his Serie B debut in 1972 for Cesena, helping them to their first promotion to the Serie A. Between 1974 and 1984, Frosio played for Perugia; he helped them win the Serie B in 1974–75 as captain, and was close to winning the 1978–79 Serie A, finishing unbeaten in second place.

Frosio finished his career with Rimini in the Serie C2 in 1985, under coach Arrigo Sacchi. He played 175 Serie A games, and 143 Serie B games.

Managerial career 
After having retired as a player, Frosio took charge of Perugia's youth sector. In 1987, he was appointed head coach of Monza, whom he helped gain promotion to the Serie B in his first season. He was then head coach of Serie A side Atalanta in 1990; Frosio coached other teams, namely Como, Modena, Ravenna, Novara, before returning to Monza between 1998 and 2000.

He finished his managerial career between the Serie C1 and Serie C2 with Padova, Ancona and Lecco.

Personal life and death 
Frosio and his wife Laura have a son, Alex, who worked as a journalist for La Gazzetta dello Sport.

Frosio died in Monza on 20 February 2022, at the age of 73.

Honours

Player
Perugia
 Serie B: 1974–75

Manager
Monza
 Serie C1: 1987–88
 Serie C2: 1995–96
 Coppa Italia Serie C: 1987–88

References

1948 births
2022 deaths
Sportspeople from Monza
Footballers from Lombardy
Italian footballers
Italian football managers
S.S.D. Pro Sesto players
A.C. Legnano players
Cesena F.C. players
A.C. Perugia Calcio players
Rimini F.C. 1912 players
Serie D players
Serie C players
Serie B players
Serie A players
A.C. Perugia Calcio managers
A.C. Monza managers
Atalanta B.C. managers
Como 1907 managers
Modena F.C. managers
Ravenna F.C. managers
Novara F.C. managers
Calcio Padova managers
A.C. Ancona managers
Calcio Lecco 1912 managers
Serie C managers
Serie B managers
People from Brianza